Dee Dee Sharp (born Dione LaRue; September 9, 1945, in Philadelphia) is an American R&B singer, who began her career recording as a backing vocalist in 1961.

Career 
Although Sharp had been playing the piano from an early age and directed church choirs for her grandfather's and other congregations in her hometown of Philadelphia, Sharp's career truly began in 1958. At the age of thirteen, Sharp's mother suffered a car accident, which spurred her to find a singing job to help support her family while her mother recovered from her injuries. This was only possible because of her grandmother's blessing, given only after Sharp promised to keep up with her schooling. Sharp responded to an ad in the daily news for backup singers. Her first job was with Willa Ward Moultrie and was soon singing backup vocals for the likes of Lloyd Price, Chubby Checker, Bobby Rydell, Frankie Avalon and Jackie Wilson.

In 1962, she was signed by Cameo/Parkway and was christened Dee Dee Sharp by producers Kal Mann and Bernie Lowe. At the time, her brother called her "Dee" and since she sang in D sharp she was given this new identity. She produced a string of successful Billboard Hot 100 top 10 hits: "Slow Twistin'" (with Chubby Checker) (#3) for which she was uncredited on the label, "Mashed Potato Time" (#2), "Gravy (For My Mashed Potatoes)" (#9), "Ride!" (#5) and "Do the Bird" (#10). Both "Mashed Potato Time" and "Ride!" each sold over one million copies, and were awarded gold discs. "Do the Bird" provided her only entry in the UK Singles Chart, where it peaked at #46 in April 1963. 

From 1962 to 1981 she appeared several times on American Bandstand, the ABC Television Network music-performance and dance series hosted by Dick Clark. She was also a regular feature on Clark's Caravan of Stars tours. In 1965 Sharp performed Steady Steady on the Ed Sullivan show. In 1967, she married record producer and Philadelphia International co-founder Kenny Gamble and recorded under the name Dee Dee Sharp-Gamble until their divorce in 1980. Unhappy with record sales, she switched to Atco/Atlantic Records and later founded Gamble Records with Kenny Gamble and Leon Huff. Over time she would also work with TSOP and Philadelphia International.

She had a brief career resurgence during the disco era and hit the charts again with her version of 10 CC's "I'm Not In Love." She also joined Lou Rawls, Billy Paul, Teddy Pendergrass, The O'Jays and Archie Bell as a member of the Philadelphia International All Stars, who had a minor hit with "Let's Clean Up the Ghetto." In 1980 she spent four weeks at number one on the Hot Dance Club Play chart with "Breaking and Entering" / "Easy Money," from her album Dee Dee.

In 1992, Sharp's 1962 hit "Gravy (For My Mashed Potatoes)" was featured in a scene in the American movie comedy Sister Act which starred Whoopi Goldberg. It was also included as part of the film's soundtrack album. More recent appearances included a performance at Pontins in the UK for the Northern Soul Show, and at the 2008 Detroit Jazz Festival. In May 2009, she appeared in Belgium at the Salle De L'Hotel de Ville.

Personal life 
In a documentary film, Muhammad Ali: The Whole Story, Sharp claimed that in 1964 she was engaged to Muhammad Ali shortly before he converted to the Muslim faith; when she was told that she herself had to become a Muslim before she married Ali, her mother ended the engagement.

Sharp was married to Kenny Gamble from 1967 to 1980, during which time she was known as Dee Dee Sharp-Gamble.

Sharp and her husband Bill Witherspoon reside in Medford, New Jersey.

Awards 
On November 9, 2013, the prestigious Sandy Hosey Lifetime Achievement Award was bestowed upon Sharp by the Artists Music Guild. Sharp thought she was in attendance to bestow the honor upon her longtime friend, Chubby Checker when she was surprised with her own honors. The Sandy Hosey Lifetime Achievement Award is presented to five artists every year by the Guild.

Discography

Studio albums

Compilation albums 
 1963: 18 Golden Hits
 1963: All the Hits
 1963: Biggest Hits
 1979: Cameo-Parkway Sessions
 1993: All the Hits & More
 1995: All the Golden Hits
 1998: What Color Is Love / Dee Dee
 2004: Chubby Checker, Bobby Rydell, Dee Dee Sharp – Bobby Rydell & Chubby Checker and Down to Earth
 2005: Best of Dee Dee Sharp 1962–1966
 2006: Sharp Goes Wild
 2010: It's Mashed Potato Time / Do the Bird
 2010: Happy 'Bout the Whole Thing + What Color Is Love + Dee Dee
 2015: Hurry On Down, It's Mashed Potato Time
 2020: The Queen of Rhythm & Blues

Singles

See also 
 List of artists who reached number one on the Billboard R&B chart
 List of artists who reached number one on the U.S. Dance Club Songs chart
 List of disco artists (A–E)
 List of people from Philadelphia
 List of acts who appeared on American Bandstand

References

External links 
 Official website

1945 births
Living people
American women singers
American rhythm and blues musicians
Musicians from Philadelphia
Philadelphia International Records artists
Northern soul musicians
People from Medford, New Jersey
Cameo Records artists
Singers from Pennsylvania
21st-century American women